William Handcock, 1st Viscount Castlemaine, PC (Ire)  (28 August 1761 – 7 January 1839) was an Irish MP and supporter of Union with Great Britain.

Life
He was born in Dublin, Ireland to Reverend Richard Handcock and Sarah Toler. In 1783, Handcock stood for Athlone in the Irish House of Commons and represented the constituency until the Act of Union in 1801. He was Constable and Governor of Athlone 1813–1839 and Governor of County Westmeath 1814–1831.

Handcock was killed on the Night of the Big Wind in 1839 when the wind blew his bedroom shutters open at Moydrum Castle and hurled him “so violently upon his back that he instantly expired”.

The Australian city of Castlemaine in the state of Victoria was named in his honour by his nephew Captain W. Wright.

Family and title
On 20 March 1782 he married Lady Florinda Trench (3 August 1766 – 9 February 1851), born in Twyford, Westmeath to William Power Keating Trench, 1st Earl of Clancarty and Anne Gardiner, Countess of Clancarty. William and Florinda had no children, and when Handcock was created Baron Castlemaine, of Moydrum (in the Peerage of Ireland) on 21 December 1812 the title had a special remainder "failing heirs of his body to his brother". He was further created Viscount Castlemaine on 12 January 1822 but without a special remainder.

On his death the viscountcy became extinct. His barony passed to his brother, whose descendants still hold the title.

Arms

References

Further reading
 thepeerage.com Accessed 12 March 2008
 Lodge, Edmund. The Peerage of the British Empire As at Present Existing: Arranged and Printed from the Personal Communications Of the Nobility, by Edmund Lodge, to Which Is Added a View of the Baronetage of the Three Kingdoms. (p. 85) London: Saunders and Otley, 1834. googlebooks Accessed 12 March 2008

|-

1761 births
1839 deaths
Irish MPs 1783–1790
Irish MPs 1790–1797
Irish MPs 1798–1800
Handcock, William
Members of the Privy Council of Ireland
Handcock, William
Handcock, William
Handcock, William
UK MPs who were granted peerages
Viscounts in the Peerage of Ireland
Peers of Ireland created by George III
William